Sempervivum tectorum, the common houseleek, is a species of flowering plant in the family Crassulaceae, native to the mountains of southern Europe, cultivated in the whole of Europe for its appearance and a Roman tradition claiming that it protects buildings against lightning strikes.

Description
It has grey-green, tufted, sessile leaves,  in diameter, which are often suffused with rose-red. In summer it bears clusters of reddish-purple flowers, in multiples of 8–16, on hairy erect flat-topped stems. The species is highly variable, in part because hundreds of cultivars have been propagated, sold, and traded for nearly 200 years.

Sempervivum tectorum was described in 1753 by Linnaeus, who noted that its leaves are ciliate, that is, fringed with hairs.

Names
This plant has been known to humans for thousands of years, and has attracted many common names and traditions. In addition to common houseleek, names include variations of the following:-

bullock's beard      
devil's beard
earwort
fuet
healing blade
homewort
imbroke
Jove's beard
Jupiter's eye
poor Jan's leaf
red-leaved houseleek      
roof foil
roof houseleek
St. George's Beard
St. Patrick's cabbage
sengreen (its name in heraldry, as used in the arms of Gonville & Caius College, Cambridge)
Thor's beard
thunderplant

Welcome-home-husband-though-never-so-drunk—a name it sometimes shares with Sedum acre.
hen and chicks - a name shared with several other plants

The specific epithet tectorum means "of house roofs", referring to a traditional location for these plants.

Cultivation and propagation

Sempervivum tectorum is one of several houseleek species to be cultivated. It is valued as groundcover for hot, dry places. It has gained the Royal Horticultural Society's Award of Garden Merit.
Sempervivum tectorum multiplies horizontally by propagation of underground roots. Propagation occurs in the spring, when budding occurs. From each mother plant you can get up to 4 new ones. They come off easily taking care not to break the roots. Seeds propagation always works in spring.

Folklore and herbalism
The plant has been traditionally thought to protect against thunderstorms, and grown on house roofs for that reason, which is why it is called House Leek. Many of its popular names in different languages reflect an association with the Roman thunder-god Jupiter, notably the Latin barba Jovis (Jupiter's beard), referred to in the Floridus traditionally attributed to Aemilius Macer, and its French derivative joubarbe, which has in turn given rise to jubard and jo-barb in English; or with the Norse thunder-god Thor as in German Donnerbart. It is also called simply thunder-plant. Anglo-Saxon þunorwyrt may have either meaning. However, the association with Jupiter has also been derived from a resemblance between the flowers and the god's beard; in modern times, it has also been called St. George's beard.

Other common names, such as Anglo-Saxon singrēne, Modern English sigrim, sil-green, etc. and aye-green, refer to its longevity. William Fernie tells a tale in support of this:

It has been believed to protect more generally against decay and against witchcraft. Jacob Grimm quotes a Provençal troubadour: "e daquel erba tenon pro li vilan sobra lur maiso" — "and that plant they keep against evil atop their house." In his Capitulare de villis vel curtis imperii, Charlemagne recommended it be grown on top of houses. In some places, S. tectorum is still traditionally grown on the roofs of houses.

The juice has been used in herbal medicine as an astringent and treatment for skin and eye diseases, including by Galen and Dioscorides, to ease inflammation and, mixed with honey, to treat thrush; however, large doses have an emetic effect. Pliny also mentions it, and Marcellus Empiricus listed it as a component in external treatments for contusions, nervous disorders, intestinal problems and abdominal pain, and mixed with honey, as part of the antidotum Hadriani (Hadrian's antidote), a broad-spectrum palliative for internal complaints.

Romans grew the plant in containers in front of windows and associated it with love medicine.

References

tectorum
Garden plants
Plants described in 1753
Taxa named by Carl Linnaeus